Regional Mexican Albums is a genre-specific record chart published weekly by Billboard magazine in the United States. The chart was established in June 1985 and originally listed the top twenty-five best-selling albums of mariachi, tejano, norteño, and grupero, which are all sub genres of  regional Mexican music. The genre is considered by musicologist as being "the biggest-selling Latin music genre in the United States", and represented the fastest ever growing Latin genre in the United States after tejano music entered the mainstream market during its 1990s golden age. Originally, Billboard based their methodology on sales surveys it sent out to record stores across the United States and by 1991 began monitoring point-of-sales compiled from Nielsen Soundscan. Musicologist and critics have since criticized the sales data compiled from Nielsen, finding that the company only provides sales from larger music chains than from small shops that specialized in Latin music—where the majority of Latin music sales are generated. The magazine decided to rank Latin music recordings in August 1970 under the title Hot Latin LPs, which only ranked the best-selling Latin albums in Los Angeles (Pop) and the East Coast (Salsa). Before the chart's inception, musicians' only chart success was the Texas Latin LPs (formerly the San Antonio Latin LPs) section where regional Mexican music was more prominent. Beginning in November 1993, Billboard lowered the rankings from twenty-five to fifteen positions on its Latin genre-specific charts, while the Top Latin Albums expanded to fifty titles. From July 2001 until April 2005, the chart increased to twenty titles and then lowered back to fifteen titles. Since 2009, the Regional Mexican Albums chart list the top twenty best-selling albums determined by sales data compiled from Nielsen SoundScan.

The first album to peak at number one was Jaula de Oro by Los Tigres del Norte in June 1984. In 1994, Selena's Amor Prohibido debuted and peaked at number one in three different calendar years (1994-1996), becoming the first artist to do so. Amor Prohibido currently holds the record for the most weeks at number one, with 96 nonconsecutive weeks. Jenni Rivera is the female act with the most number ones at nine on the Regional Mexican Albums chart.
The current number one album is Danado by Ivan Cornejo.

Year-end best selling albums
According to the RIAA, albums containing more than 50% Spanish language content are awarded with gold certifications (Disco de Oro) for U.S. shipments of 100,000 units; platinum (Disco de Platino) for 200,000 and multi-platinum (Multi-Platino) for 400,000 and following in increments of 200,000 thereafter. In the following table, the certifications shown are standard as any album release in United States: gold certification for sales of 500,000 copies; platinum, for one million units, and multi-platinum for more than one million sold.

See also
Regional styles of Mexican music

Notes

Sources

References

External links
 Official Billboard website

Billboard charts
Regional Mexican music albums